Plaza de la Escandalera is a plaza in Oviedo, Asturias, Spain. Its location between the historic and commercial centres of the city makes it a popular area to walk through.

The statue "Maternity" (La Maternidad) by Colombian-artist Fernando Botero is located in the plaza.

Location

The square is rectangular, bounded on its west side by the streets Paseo de los Alamos and Uria, which run parallel, and the Campo de San Francisco. On the east side leave the streets of San Francisco in the south corner, Argüelles and, tangentially, the Pelayo in the northern corner.

Naming history
The square has had at different times the names March 27, General Ordóñez, Republic, and Generalissimo and Escandalera. It has also had other name proposals such as Independence, General Meeting, and Plaza of the Heroes Noval and Ordóñez.

The name Escandalera began to be used unofficially beginning in the 19th century. At the time Escandalera referred to the heated discussions, within the municipal corporation, in the press, and the village, as a result of the first house built in the corner of the streets of San Francisco and Fruela.

Buildings
 Casa Conde: Fully occupies the north side of the square. It was designed in 1904 by architect Juan Miguel de la Guardia on a French-inspired eclectic style, as seen in its mansard roof and the domes on the roundabouts in the corners.
 The Municipal Tourism Office: A grey building called El Escorialín on the corner of the plaza.

Gallery

References

Oviedo
Plazas in Spain